One Second is Yello's fifth original studio album, having been preceded by a 'new mix' compilation the previous year. Released in 1987, the album is noteworthy for featuring both Billy Mackenzie and Shirley Bassey, the latter singing vocals on "The Rhythm Divine".

The songs "Call It Love", "Si Senor The Hairy Grill", "Moon On Ice", "Hawaiian Chance" were used on episodes of Miami Vice and the song "Santiago" used as a sample from Dunya Yunis' "Abu Zeluf". A couple of songs were also used in the 1990 film Nuns on the Run.

The song "Si Senor The Hairy Grill" was used as theme song for the Fox TV show The Edge.

Track listing
 "La Habanera"
 "Moon on Ice"
 "Call It Love"
 "Le Secret Farida"
 "Hawaiian Chance"
 "The Rhythm Divine"
 "Santiago"
 "Goldrush"
 "Oh Yeah"
 "Dr. Van Steiner"
 "Si Senor the Hairy Grill"
 "L'Hôtel"

"Oh Yeah" is an addition to the US version of the album, the track is originally on the previous album, Stella. Most vinyl and cassette versions of the album also omit the final track, "L'Hôtel". On release LP830956-1 (1987), Oh Yeah is track #6 at the end of side A, L'Hôtel is missing, and the rest of the tracks are in the same order.

Chart performance

Singles – The Official UK Singles Chart / Gallup (United Kingdom)

2005 Remastered issue
 "La Habanera"
 "Moon on Ice"
 "Call It Love"
 "Le Secret Farida"
 "Hawaiian Chance"
 "The Rhythm Divine"
 "Santiago"
 "Goldrush"
 "Dr. Van Steiner"
 "Si Senor the Hairy Grill"
 "L'Hôtel"
 "Goldrush II (12" Mix)"
 "The Rhythm Divine (1992 Version)"
 "Call It Love (12" Mix)"
 "Life Is a Snowball"
 "Tool in Rose"

Certifications

References 

Yello albums
1987 albums
Mercury Records albums
Vertigo Records albums